Jakob Kaiser (8 February 1888 – 7 May 1961) was a German politician and resistance leader during World War II.

Jakob Kaiser was born in Hammelburg, Lower Franconia, Kingdom of Bavaria. Following in his father's footsteps, Kaiser began a career as a bookbinder. It was during this time that he became politically active as a member of a Catholic trade union, through which he became a leader of the Christian labour movement during the Weimar Republic.

Kaiser increased his participation in politics by becoming a member of the Centre Party, where he began serving in the role of representative chairman of Rhineland in 1919. He was elected to the Reichstag in 1933.

Resistance 
After the Nazis came to power in 1933, Hitler abolished all unions, replacing them with the Nazi controlled German Labour Front. Kaiser opposed National Socialism and he joined the resistance in 1934. He was arrested by the Gestapo in 1938 under suspicion of treason, but released shortly thereafter.

Through his participation in the Cologne-resistance circle, Kaiser became a close associated of the former Mayor of Leipzig, Carl Goerdeler. His relationship with Goerdeler allowed him to come into contact with Claus von Stauffenberg. Although he was not directly informed of the 20 July Plot, his knowledge of Stauffenberg's intention to assassinate Hitler as well as his close ties to the resistance group forced him to go into hiding for the remainder of World War II.

Leader of the East German CDU 

After the war, Kaiser returned to politics and worked with Andreas Hermes to found the East Berlin division of the Christian Democratic Union (CDU). He was elected president of the Berlin CDU (both the Western and Eastern sections of the party).

Kaiser belonged to a group within the CDU called the Christian Socialists. They called for the nationalisation of some major industries.

In 1946 Kaiser helped found the Free German Trade Union Federation (FDGB). In the same year he was elected co-chairman of the East German CDU (together with Ernst Lemmer). Although his political views were progressive, he was critical of the Communist Party of Germany and its Soviet-supported leaders. His belief that the German Congress was controlled by the Soviets resulted in his refusal to join.

In 1947 during the Ahlen conference, a joint conference of West and East German CDU leaders, Kaiser's plan of nationalisation of key industries and other moderate leftwing ideas were adopted by the party.

In 1947 the Soviets forced him to resign as party chairman. However, he remained a member of the party's Executive Committee.

In 1948 Kaiser was forced to leave East Berlin and he went to West Berlin where he joined the West German Christian Democratic Union (CDU). Within the CDU he became a major rival of Konrad Adenauer, the party leader. Kaiser disagreed with Adenauer's social market economy and called for the nationalisation of key industries. Kaiser strongly believed in a neutral, united Germany, and hoped that Germany would be a bridge between the West and the East.

In 1950 Kaiser was elected a vice-chairman of the West German CDU. From 1949 until 1957 he was Minister of All-German Affairs in Adenauer's cabinet.

Kaiser died on 7 May 1961 in Berlin. He is buried in the Waldfriedhof Zehlendorf, in the Steglitz-Zehlendorf borough of Berlin.

Marriages
Kaiser was married twice. In 1953, after the death of his first wife, he married his longtime colleague in trade union activism, Elfriede Kaiser-Nebgen (1890–1983). She was instrumental in helping to save his life after the failure of the 20 July Plot.

Legacy
The  Jakob-Kaiser-Platz, a transportation hub in Charlottenburg-Nord (Berlin), was named after him on 12 May 1961, five days after his death.
The Jakob-Kaiser-Haus is home to 1,745 offices, 314 of which belong to current members of the German Bundestag

See also 
 East Germany
 West Germany
 Konrad Adenauer
 Communist Party of Germany
 Christian Democratic Union (East Germany)
 Christian Democratic Union in Exile
 Christian Democratic Union

References

External links
 

1888 births
1961 deaths
People from Bad Kissingen (district)
German Roman Catholics
Centre Party (Germany) politicians
Christian Democratic Union (East Germany) politicians
Members of the 20 July plot
Grand Crosses 1st class of the Order of Merit of the Federal Republic of Germany
People from the Kingdom of Bavaria
Roman Catholics in the German Resistance
German trade unionists
Members of the Reichstag of the Weimar Republic
Catholic socialists
Members of the Bundestag for Berlin
Members of the Bundestag 1953–1957
Members of the Bundestag 1949–1953
Members of the Bundestag for the Christian Democratic Union of Germany
Members of Parlamentarischer Rat
Burials at the Waldfriedhof Zehlendorf